Franklin Rudolf Ankersmit (born 20 March 1945, Deventer, Netherlands) is professor of intellectual history and historical theory at the University of Groningen.

Ankersmit, member of the family of textile manufacturers Ankersmit, initially studied physics and mathematics in Leiden for three years and then did his military service. He next studied both history and philosophy at the University of Groningen. In 1981 he took his doctoral degree at that same University with a dissertation entitled Narrative Logic: A Semantic Analysis of the Historian’s Language. In 1986 he was elected member of the Royal Netherlands Academy of Arts and Sciences (KNAW). He is founder and was until 2017 chief editor of the Journal of the Philosophy of History promoting a strictly philosophical approach to the reflection on the writing of history.

In 1992 he was appointed full professor for intellectual history  and philosophy of history at the University of Groningen. His main interests, apart from philosophy of history, are political philosophy, aesthetics and the notion of historical experience (or sensation). The notion of representation is of central importance in his writings focusing on historical,  political and aesthetic representation. He published fifteen books (edited books not included) of which many were translated into English, German, Spanish, Portuguese, Indonesian, Polish, Hungarian, Czech, Russian and Chinese. He wrote over two hundred-fifty scientific articles and is member of the editorial board of several journals in his fields of study. With his book on historical experience he won the Socrates challenge cup  in 2008. He retired in 2010 and was appointed in that same year Officer in the Order of Orange-Nassau by H.M. the Queen of the Netherlands. In 2011 he was granted an Honorary Degree in the Humanities by the University of Ghent and in that same year he was appointed member of the Academia Europaea.

Philosophy of History 
In the 1980s he developed a narrativist philosophy of history in which the order and coherence the historian gives to the facts of the past are said to be presented in, and with a historical ‘narrative’. In the 1990s he elaborated this idea into a philosophy of historical representation. According to this philosophy the historian  does not ‘translate’ a meaning allegedly present in the past itself into the text of his representation, but he creates historical meaning in his representation of the past which can be seen as a substitute for the absent past itself. Since the word ‘narrative’ invites unwelcome associations with the novel, Ankersmit soon replaced it by the far more adequate word ‘representation’. This is where his philosophy of history basically differs from that of Hayden White.  Ankersmit analyzed the notion of representation with Gottfried Wilhelm Leibniz's logic and metaphysics – no philosopher in the history of Western thought granted to representation a more central place than Leibniz. In his later work Ankersmit concentrates on the issue of historical rationality; his aim then is to establish on what rational grounds historians prefer one representation of the past to another. Leibniz is here his guide as well. Although Ankersmit is often perceived as a postmodernist, his work can also be seen as drawing from the 19th century historian Friedrich Meinecke and as "an almost neo-Kantian desire to counter the hegemony of science in history and politics".

Politics 
Ankersmit was a member of the Dutch liberal party, the VVD (People's Party for Freedom and Democracy), and one of the authors of the Liberal Manifesto that this party presented. In 2009 he ended his membership of that party, since it had turned, in his view, from a liberal into a neoliberal party. He sees Neoliberalism as a return to Medieval feudalism: both wish to entrust public competences and responsibilities to (semi-)private hands. Whereas liberalism was born at the end of the 18th and the beginning of the 19th centuries from the rejection  of feudalism. The Anglo-Saxon countries could forget about this, since they remained outside the grip of the French Revolution. Ankersmit was member of the National Convention, a commission installed by  minister Alexander Pechtold in order to offer advice about how to strengthen democracy. More recently he insisted that representative democracy is, in fact, an elective aristocracy, which is, from a logical point of view, a peculiar mixture of Medieval political representation by the three Estates and the concept of sovereignty, as established under absolute monarchy. Ankersmit regularly participates at public debate on democracy, political representation, liberalism and related topics. In 2016 he became a member of the political party Forum for Democracy, but due to what he perceived as a lack of internal democracy of the party he became disappointed and left the party late 2017.

Bibliography 
 Narrative logic. A semantic analysis of the historian's language, Den Haag: Nijhoff, 1983
 Denken over geschiedenis. Een overzicht van moderne geschiedfilosofische opvattingen, Groningen: Wolters/Noordhoff, 1983, 1986
The Reality Effect in the Writing of History: The Dynamics of Historiographical Topology, Amsterdam, Noord-Hollandsche, 1989.
 De navel van de geschiedenis. Over interpretatie, representatie en historische realiteit, Groningen: Historische Uitgeverij Groningen, 1990
 De historische ervaring, Groningen: Historische Uitgeverij Groningen, 1993
 History and Tropology. The Rise and Fall of Metaphor, Berkeley/Los Angeles/Oxford: University of California Press, 1994
 De spiegel van het verleden. Exploraties deel I: Geschiedtheorie, Kampen, Kok Agora, 1996
 De macht van representatie. Exploraties deel II: cultuurfilosofie en esthetica, Kampen: Kok Agora, 1996
 Macht door representatie. Exploraties deel III: politieke filosofie, Kampen: Kok Agora 1997)
 Aesthetic politics. Political philosophy beyond fact and value, Stanford, Stanford/Cambridge UP, 1997
Historical Representation, Stanford: Stanford University Press, 2001
Political Representation, Stanford: Stanford University Press, 2002
Sublime Historical experience, Stanford/Cambridge 2005
 "Representational Democracy: An Aesthetic Approach to Conflict and Compromise", Common Knowledge 8.1 (2002) 24-46.

References

External links

Bibliographical references for Professor Ankersmit's output can be found at the following sites:
English Language only Bibliography
Main Bibliography
Academia Vitae faculty website

1945 births
Living people
20th-century Dutch historians
21st-century Dutch historians
Historiographers
20th-century Dutch philosophers
21st-century Dutch philosophers
Forum for Democracy (Netherlands) politicians
People from Deventer
Academic staff of the University of Groningen
Members of Academia Europaea
Members of the Royal Netherlands Academy of Arts and Sciences
Philosophers of history